Boyacá is a town and municipality in the Márquez Province, part of the department of Boyacá, Colombia. Boyacá limits Tunja and Soracá in the north, Jenesano in the south, Nuevo Colón and Ramiriquí in the west and Ventaquemada in the east.

Etymology 
The name of both the municipality and the department, Boyacá, comes from Chibcha and means "Region of the blankets" or "Enclosure of the cacique".

History 
Boyacá in the times before the Spanish conquest was ruled by the zaque of nearby Hunza, the ruler of the Muisca, who were organised in their loose Muisca Confederation.

Modern Boyacá was founded on August 8, 1537, by Spanish conquistador Gonzalo Jiménez de Quesada who was searching for the mythical El Dorado.

Gallery

References

Bibliography 
 Senado de la República de Colombia (1989), Municipios colombianos. Bogotá: Pama Editores Ltda. 

Municipalities of Boyacá Department
Populated places established in 1537
1537 establishments in the Spanish Empire
1537 disestablishments in the Muisca Confederation
Muysccubun